Andrew D. Bernstein is an American sports photographer.

Career
Bernstein grew up in Brooklyn and attended Brooklyn's Midwood High School.

His company, Andrew D. Bernstein Associates Photography, Inc. has served as the official photographer for most of Los Angeles's professional sports teams. Bernstein is in his 33rd consecutive season serving as the longest tenured NBA league photographer and official team photographer for the Lakers and Clippers. He also has been serving as the official team photographer for the Kings for the past 22 years. Bernstein also holds the title of Director of Photography for Crypto.com Arena and Nokia Theater LA Live since both of the buildings' ribbon cuttings in 1999 and 2007. Previously, Bernstein was the team photographer at the Dodgers from 1983–1994.

Bernstein has been photographer for the United States Olympic national basketball team since the 1992 "Dream Team", and has extensively covered all USA gold medal-winning teams since.  Bernstein has worked commercially on advertising campaigns for Shaquille O'Neal, Kobe Bryant, Mia Hamm, LeBron James and many others for brands such as Nike, Reebok, Adidas, Pepsi, Coca-Cola and Icy Hot. His work has been showcased in many exhibitions over the years. He is only one of four photographers whose work is on permanent display at the Naismith Memorial Basketball Hall of Fame in Springfield, MA. Bernstein was inducted into the National Jewish Sports Hall of Fame in 2013.

Bernstein is the host of Through The Lens, which is a regular feature on the Lakers channel on Time Warner Cable SportsNet LA. It is a unique perspective of Lakers history through his photos that Bernstein hosts with a famous guest.

Books

 
Bryant, Kobe. The Mamba Mentality: How I Play. MCD, 2018.

References

External links
Andrew D. Bernstein Associates Photography
Andrew D. Bernstein at the Sports Shooter Academy
Through My Lens: The life of NBA Photographer

Living people
Artists from Brooklyn
American photojournalists
Artists from California
Jewish American artists
Sports photographers
National Basketball Association personnel
Midwood High School alumni
Journalists from New York City
People from San Marino, California
Year of birth missing (living people)
21st-century American Jews